Giraldo is a Spanish and Italian surname. Notable people with the surname include:

Alejandra Giraldo (born 1984), Colombian journalist, newscaster and social commentator
Andrés Giraldo (born 1989), a Colombian footballer 
Blas Giraldo Reyes Rodríguez, Cuban librarian and a member of Varela project
Carla Giraldo (born 1986), a Colombian actress, model and singer
Carmiña Giraldo (born  1976), a Colombian former professional tennis player
Daniel Giraldo (born  1992), a Colombian footballer 
David Giraldo, Colombian forward that plays for Millonarios in the Copa Mustang
David González Giraldo (born 1982), Colombian football goalkeeper who plays for Club Atlético Huracán in Argentina
Greg Giraldo (1965–2010), American stand-up comedian, television personality and former lawyer
Hernan Giraldo, leader of the Colombian paramilitary organization Tayrona Resistance Block
Lauren Giraldo (born 1998), an American actress
Neil Giraldo (born 1955), an American musician
Santiago Giraldo (born 1987), Colombian male tennis player from Pereira in Colombia
Víctor Giraldo, Colombian football midfielder

See also
Giraldo, Antioquia, a town and municipality in Antioquia Department, Colombia
Geraldo, a given name
Geraldo (disambiguation), for other uses

Spanish-language surnames